Naval Auxiliary Air Facility Lewiston, located at Lewiston, Maine, is a closed facility of the United States Navy, and was established as one of five air facilities to support Naval Air Station Brunswick, Maine, during World War II.

History
A municipal airport opened in Androscoggin County, Maine, United States, in 1935. It is located four nautical miles (7 km) southwest of the cities of Auburn and Lewiston, both of which own and operate the airport, although it is located solely in the city of Auburn. From late 1942, during World War II, the airfield was under the control of the United States Navy for use as a base for anti-submarine patrols by Squadron VS-31.

The U.S. Navy established Naval Air Station Brunswick, Maine, on 15 April 1943, to train American, Royal Navy Fleet Air Arm,
and Royal Canadian Air Force torpedo bomber pilots and radar operators until 1945. Five auxiliary landing fields were used in support of this facility, at Bar Harbor, Casco Bay, Lewiston, Rockland, and Sanford.

The aerodrome at Lewiston was established as a Naval Auxiliary Air Facility in April 1943. It was redesignated a Naval Auxiliary Air Station in August 1945, and disestablished on 1 December 1945 during the first round of postwar base
closings, with the site being declared surplus to the Navy's requirements in 1946, and handed back to the cities of Auburn and Lewiston in 1947/1948.

Units
Torpedo Squadron 153 (VT-153) was established at NAAF Lewiston on 26 March 1945, transferring to Naval Air Station Oceana, Virginia, on 1 June 1945.

Current day
The former naval facility operates as Auburn/Lewiston Municipal Airport.

References

1935 establishments in Maine
1945 disestablishments in Maine
Airports in Maine
Military installations closed in 1945
Military installations in Maine
Lewiston
Closed installations of the United States Navy